HFRS may refer to:
 Hampshire Fire and Rescue Service
 Hantavirus hemorrhagic fever with renal syndrome
 Helicopter Flight Rescue System
 Helix fast-response system
 Hertfordshire Fire and Rescue Service
 Humberside Fire and Rescue Service

See also 
 HFR (disambiguation)